The Milwaukee Bicycle Co. is brand of bicycle and bicycle parts. It is the house brand of Ben's Cycle and Fitness, a family-owned bicycle shop in the Lincoln Village neighborhood of Milwaukee, Wisconsin.

Milwaukee Bicycle Co. frames are manufactured by Waterford Precision Cycles, owned by Richard Schwinn (whose family founded the Schwinn Bicycle Company).

See also
Fyxation
Lincoln Village, City of Milwaukee, Wisconsin

References

External links
 

Cycle manufacturers of the United States
Companies based in Milwaukee
Milwaukee County, Wisconsin